Sir Peter Frederick Strawson  (23 November 1919 – 13 February 2006) was an English philosopher.  He was the Waynflete Professor of Metaphysical Philosophy at the University of Oxford (Magdalen College) from 1968 to 1987. Before that, he was appointed as a college lecturer at University College, Oxford, in 1947, and became a tutorial fellow the following year, until 1968. On his retirement in 1987, he returned to the college and continued working there until shortly before his death. His portrait was painted by the artists Muli Tang and Daphne Todd.

The Stanford Encyclopedia of Philosophy says that Strawson "exerted a considerable influence on philosophy, both during his lifetime and, indeed, since his death".

Early years
Strawson was born in Ealing, west London, and brought up in Finchley, north London, by his parents, both of whom were teachers. He was educated at Christ's College, Finchley, followed by St John's College, Oxford, where he read Philosophy, Politics and Economics.

Philosophical work
Strawson first became well known with his article "On Referring" (1950), a criticism of Bertrand Russell's theory of descriptions (see also Definite descriptions) that Russell explained in the famous "On Denoting" article (1905).

In philosophical methodology, there are (at least) two important and interrelated features of Strawson's work that are worthy of note. The first is the project of a 'descriptive' metaphysics, and the second is his notion of a shared conceptual scheme, composed of concepts operated in everyday life. In his book Individuals (1959), Strawson attempts to give a description of various concepts that form an interconnected web, representing (part of) our common, shared, human conceptual scheme. In particular, he examines our conceptions of basic particulars, and how they are variously brought under general spatio-temporal concepts. What makes this a metaphysical project is that it exhibits, in fine detail, the structural features of our thought about the world, and thus precisely delimits how we, humans, think about reality.

Strawson was made a Fellow of the British Academy in 1960 and Foreign Honorary Member of the American Academy of Arts and Sciences in 1971. He was president of the Aristotelian Society from 1969 to 1970. He was knighted, in 1977, for services to philosophy.

Personal life
After serving as a captain in the Royal Electrical and Mechanical Engineers during World War II, Strawson married Ann Martin in 1945. They had four children, including the philosopher Galen Strawson. P.F. Strawson lived in Oxford all his adult life and died in hospital on 13 February 2006 after a short illness. He was elder brother to Major General John Strawson.

The obituary in The Guardian noted that "Oxford was the world capital of philosophy between 1950 and 1970, and American academics flocked there, rather than the traffic going the other way. That golden age had no greater philosopher than Sir Peter Strawson."

In its obituary, The Times of London described him as a "philosopher of matchless range who made incisive, influential contributions to problems of language and metaphysics." The author went on to say:

Partial bibliography

Books
 Introduction to Logical Theory. London: Methuen, 1952.
 Japanese translation by S. Tsunetoshi, et al. (Kyoto: Houritsu Bunkasya, 1994)
 Individuals: An Essay in Descriptive Metaphysics. London: Methuen, 1959.
 German translation by F. Scholz (Stuttgart: Reclam, 1972)
 French translation by A. Shalom and P. Drong (Paris: Editions du Seuil, 1973)
 Italian translation by E. Bencivenga (Milan: Feltrinelli, 1978)
 Japanese translation by H. Nakamura (Tokyo: Misuzu Shobo, 1978)
 Polish translation by B. Chwedenczuk (Warsaw: Wydawniczy Pax, 1980)
 Spanish translation by A. Suarez and L. Villanueva (Madrid: Taurus, 1989)
Brazilian Portuguese translation by P. J. Smith (São Paulo: Editora Unesp, 2019)
 The Bounds of Sense: An Essay on Kant's Critique of Pure Reason. London: Methuen, 1966.
 Spanish translation by C. Luis Andre (Madrid: Revista de Occidente, 1975)
 German translation by E. Lange (Hain, 1981)
 Italian translation by M. Palumbo (Roma-Bari: Laterza, 1985)
 Japanese translation by T. Kumagai, et al. (Tokyo: Keiso Shobo, 1987)
 Logico-Linguistic Papers. London: Methuen, 1971
 Freedom and Resentment and other Essays. London: Methuen, 1974
 Subject and Predicate in Logic and Grammar. London: Methuen, 1974
 Skepticism and Naturalism: Some Varieties. New York: Columbia University Press, 1985.
 Analysis and Metaphysics: An Introduction to Philosophy. Oxford: Oxford University Press, 1992.
 Estonian translation by T. Hallap (Tartu: University of Tartu Press, 2016)
 Entity and Identity. Oxford: Oxford University Press, 1997.
 Philosophical Writings. Oxford: Oxford University Press, 2011.

Articles

 "Necessary Propositions and Entailment Statements" (Mind, 1948)
 "Truth" (Analysis, 1949)
 "Ethical Intuitionism" (Philosophy, 1949)
 "Truth" (Proceedings of the Aristotelian Society suppl. vol. xxiv, 1950)
 "On Referring" (Mind, 1950)
 "Particular and General" (Proceedings of the Aristotelian Society, 1953
 "Wittgenstein's Philosophical Investigations (Mind, vol. 63, 1954)
 "A Logician's Landscape" (Philosophy, Vol. 30, 1955)
 "Construction and Analysis" in A.J. Ayer et al., The Revolution in Philosophy. London: Macmillan, 1956
 "Singular Terms, Ontology and Identity" (Mind, Vol. 65, 1956)
 "In Defence of a Dogma" with H. P. Grice (Philosophical Review, 1956)
 "Logical Subjects and Physical Objects" (Philosophy and Phenomenological Research, 1957)
 "Propositions, Concepts and Logical Truths" (Philosophical Quarterly, Vol. 7, 1957)
 "Proper Names" (Proceedings of the Aristotelian Society, Supp. Vol. 31, 1957)
 "On Justifying Induction" (Philosophical Studies, 1958)
 "The Post-Linguistic Thaw" (Times Literary Supplement, 1960)
 "Freedom and Resentment" (Proceedings of the British Academy, Vol. 48, 1960)
 "Singular Terms and Predication" (Journal of Philosophy, 1961)
 "Perception and Identification" (Proceedings of the Aristotelian Society, Supp. Vol. 35, 1961)
 "Carnap's Views on Constructed Systems v. Natural Languages in Analytical Philosophy" in The Philosophy of Rudolf Carnap, ed. P.A. Schilpp (La Salle Ill.: Open Court, 1963)
 " A Problem about Truth: A reply to Mr. Warnock" in Truth, ed. G. Pitcher, Englewood Cliffs (N.J.: Prentice Hall, 1964)
 "Truth: A Reconsideration of Austin's Views" (Philosophical Quarterly, Vol. 15, 1965)
 "Self, Mind and Body" (Common Factor, Vol. 4, 1966)
 "Is Existence Never A Predicate" (Critica, Vol. 1, 1967)
 "Bennett on Kant's Analytic" (Philosophical Review, Vol. 77, 1968)
 "Meaning and Truth" (Proceedings of the British Academy, Oxford: Oxford University Press, 1969)
 "Imagination and Perception" in Experience and Theory, ed. L. Foster and J.W. Swanson (Amherst: University of Massachusetts Press, 1970)
 "Categories" in Ryle: A Collection of Critical essays, ed. O.P. Wood and G. Pitcher, (New York: Doubleday, 1970)
 "The Asymmetry of Subjects and Predicates" in Language, Belief and Metaphysics, ed. H.E. Kiefer and M.K. Munitz (New York: State of University of New York Press, 1970)
 "Self-Reference, Contradiction and Content-Parasitic Predicates" (Indian review of Philosophy, 1972)
 "Different Conceptions of Analytical Philosophy" (Tijdschrift voor Filosofie, 1973)
 "Austin and 'Locutionary Meaning'" in Essays on J.L. Austin, ed. I Berlin (Oxford: Clarendon Press, 1973)
 "On Understanding the Structure of One's Language" in Freedom and Resentment and Other Essays
 "Positions for Quantifiers" in semantics and Philosophy, ed. M.K. Munitz and P.K. Unger (New York: New York University Press, 1974)
 "Does Knowledge Have Foundations?" (Conocimiento y Creencia, 1974)
 "Semantics, Logic and Ontology" (Neue Häfte für Philosophie, 1975)
 "Knowledge and Truth" (Indian Philosophical Quarterly, Vol. 3, No. 3, 1976)

 "Entity and Identity" in Contemporary British Philosophy Fourth Series, ed. H.D. Lewis (London: Allen and Unwin, 1976)
 "Scruton and Wright on Anti-Realism" (Proceedings of the Aristotelian Society, Vol. 77, 1976)
 "May Bes and Might Have Beens" in Meaning and Use, ed. A. Margalit (London: Reidel, 1979)
 "Perception and its Objects" in Perception and Identity: Essays Presented to A.J. Ayer, ed. G.F. Macdonald (London: Macmillan, 1979)
 "Universals" (Midwest Studies in Philosophy, 1979)
 "Belief, Reference and Quantification" (Monist, 1980)
 "P.F. Strawson Replies" in Philosophical Subjects Presented to P.F. Strawson, ed. Zak Van Straaten (Oxford: Clarendon Press, 1980)
 "Comments and Reples" (Philosophia, Vol. 10, 1981)
 "Logical Form and Logical Constants" in Logical Form, Predication and Ontology, ed. P.K. Sen (India: Macmillan, 1982)
 "Liberty and Necessity" in Spinoza, His Thought & Work, ed. Nathan Rotenstreich and Norma Schneider (Jerusalem: The Israel Academy of Sciences and Humanities, 1983)
 "Causation and Explanation" in Essays on Davidson, ed. Bruce Vermazen and J. Hintikka (Oxford: Oxford University Press, 1985)
 "Direct Singular Reference: Intended Reference and Actual Reference" in Wo steht die Analytische Philosophie Heute?, 1986
 "Reference and its Roots" in The Philosophy of W.V. Quine. ed L.E. Hahn and P.A. Schilpp (La Salle Ill.: Open Court, 1986)
 "Kant's Paralogisms: Self Consciousness and the 'Outside Observer'" in Theorie der Subjektivität, ed. K. Cramer, F. Fulda, R.-P. Hortsmann, U. Poshast (Frankfurt am Main: Suhrkamp, 1987)
 "Concepts and Properties, or Predication and Copulation" (Philosophical Quarterly, Vol. 37, 1987)
 "Kant's New Foundations of Metaphysics" in Metaphysik nach Kant, ed. Dieter Henrich and R.-P. Horstmann (Stuttgart: Klett Cotta, 1988)
 "Ma Philosophie: son développement, son thème central et sa nature générale" (Revue de thėologie et de philosophie, Vol. 120, 1988)
 "Sensibility, Understanding and the Doctrine of Synthesis: Comments on D. Henrich and P. Guyer" in Kant's Transcendental Deductions, ed. E. Forster (Stanford: Stanford University Press, 1989)
 "Two Conceptions of Philosophy" in Perspectives on Quine, ed. Robert Barrett and Roger Gibson (Oxford: Blackwell: 1990)
 "The Incoherence of Empiricism" (Proceedings of the Aristotelian Society, Supp. Vol. 66, 1992)
 "Comments on Some Aspects of Peter Unger's Identity, Consciousness and Value (Philosophy and Phenomenological Research, Vol. 42, 1992)
 "Echoes of Kant" (Times Literary Supplement, 1992, "The State of Philosophy")
 "Replies" in Ensayos sobre Strawson, ed. Carlos E. Carosi (Montevideo: Universidad de la Republica, 1992)
 "Knowing From Words" in Knowing From Words, ed. B. K. Matilal and A. Chakrabati (Dordrecht: Kluwer Academic Publishers, 1992)
 "My Philosophy" and "Replies" to critics in The Philosophy of P.F. Strawson, ed. P.K. Sen and R.K. Verma (New Delhi: Indian Council of Philosophical Research, 1994)
 "Individuals" in Philosophical Problems Today, Vol. 1, ed. G. Floistad (Dordrecht: Kluwer Academic Publishers, 1994)
 "The Problem of Realism and the A Priori" in Kant and Contemporary Epistemology, ed. Paolo Parrini (Dordrecht: Kluwer Academic Publishers, 1994)
 "Introduction", "Kant on Substance" and "Meaning and Context" in Entity and Identity (Oxford: Oxford University Press, 1997)

Notes

References
 Philosophical Subjects: Essays Presented to P. F. Strawson, ed. Zak Van Straaten (Oxford: Clarendon Press, 1980)
 Leibniz and Strawson: A New Essay in Descriptive Metaphysics, Clifford Brown (Munich: Philosophia Verlag, 1990)
 Ensayos sobre Strawson, ed. Carlos E. Carosi (Montevideo: Universidad de la Republica, 1992)
 The Philosophy of P. F. Strawson, ed. Pranab Kumar Sen and Roop Rekha Verma (Indian Council of Philosophical Research, 1995)
 The Philosophy of P. F. Strawson, Lewis E. Hahn, ed. (Open Court, 1998)
 Theories of Truth, Richard Kirkham (MIT Press, 1992). (Chapter 10 contains a detailed discussion of Strawson's performative theory of truth.)
 Strawson & Kant:  The Bounds of Sense. GELAIN, Itamar Luís & CONTE, Jaimir (Org.) Pelotas: NEPFIL (On-line), 2016.
 Ensaios sobre a filosofia de Strawson. CONTE, Jaimir & GELAIN, Itamar Luís (Org.). Florianópolis: Editora UFSC, 2015.
 Strawson and Kant, ed. Hans-Johann Glock (Oxford: Oxford University Press, 2003)
 Sir Peter Strawson (1919–2006), Univ Newsletter, Issue 23, page 4, Hilary 2006.
 Peter Strawson, Clifford Brown (Acumen Publishing, 2006)
 Free Will and Reactive Attitudes: Perspectives on P. F. Strawson's 'Freedom and Resentment'. edited by Micheal McKenna and Paul Russell, (2016)

External links

 Snowdon, Paul "Strawson, Sir Peter Frederick (1919–2006), philosopher". Oxford Dictionary of National Biography (19 May 2011) [Archived]
 Snowdon, Paul, "Strawson, Peter Frederick, 1919-2006", Proceedings of the British Academy, V. 150 Biographical Memoirs of Fellows, VI. pp. 221-244 (2008)
Sir Peter Strawson - obituary for The Independent by Alan Ryan
 Peter Frederick Strawson (Stanford Encyclopedia of Philosophy)
Snapshot: P. F. Strawson 2019 essay by Anil Gomes for The Philosophers' Magazine
 P.F. Strawson, The First Edition of "Freedom and Resentment" 

1919 births
2006 deaths
20th-century British non-fiction writers
20th-century British philosophers
21st-century British non-fiction writers
21st-century British philosophers
Alumni of St John's College, Oxford
Analytic philosophers
Aristotelian philosophers
British Army personnel of World War II
British ethicists
British logicians
British male non-fiction writers
Military personnel from London
Epistemologists
Fellows of Magdalen College, Oxford
Fellows of the American Academy of Arts and Sciences
Fellows of the British Academy
Fellows of University College, Oxford
Kantian philosophers
Knights Bachelor
Metaphysicians
Ontologists
Ordinary language philosophy
People educated at Christ's College, Finchley
People from Ealing
People from Finchley
Philosophers of culture
Philosophers of education
Philosophers of history
Philosophers of language
Philosophers of logic
Philosophers of mind
Presidents of the Aristotelian Society
Royal Electrical and Mechanical Engineers officers
Peter
Waynflete Professors of Metaphysical Philosophy